Kipchak may refer to:

 Kipchaks, a medieval Turkic people
 Kipchak languages, a Turkic language group
 Kipchak language, an extinct Turkic language of the Kipchak group
 Kipchak Khanate or Golden Horde
 Kipchak Mosque, a mosque in the village of Gypjak
 Kipchak (village)
 Kipchak (Aimaq tribe), a tribe of Kyrgyz origin in Afghanistan
 Desht-i Kipchak
 Qıpçaq, village and municipality in the Qakh Rayon of Azerbaijan
 Qepchaq (disambiguation), places in Iran